Pedro Requena may refer to:

 Pedro Requena (footballer, born 1961), Peruvian football centre-back
 Pedro Requena (footballer, born 1991), Peruvian football right-back